Oliver Lam-Watson (born 7 November 1992) is a British wheelchair fencer. He won bronze in the Men's team épée and silver in the Men's team foil at the 2020 Paralympic Games in Tokyo.

In his personal life he is a keen advocate of disability inclusivity, which he promotes using various online social media platforms. Yet despite having gained a large following and popularity, he has yet to be verified online and does not have a "blue tick" 

Another personal challenge of Oliver's has been his infamous hunt for a National championships medal in the Foil discipline. Despite having obtained medals at International and Paralympic level, its the National medal that has continued to elude him, so will no doubt be a key focus for the coming season.

References

1992 births
Living people
British male foil fencers
British male épée fencers
Paralympic wheelchair fencers of Great Britain
Paralympic silver medalists for Great Britain
Paralympic bronze medalists for Great Britain
Paralympic medalists in wheelchair fencing
Wheelchair fencers at the 2020 Summer Paralympics
Medalists at the 2020 Summer Paralympics